Bolotsky is a rural locality (a settlement) in Andreyevskoye Rural Settlement, Sudogodsky District, Vladimir Oblast, Russia. The population was 694 as of 2010. There are 13 streets.

Geography 
Bolotsky is located 24 km east of Sudogda (the district's administrative centre) by road. Andreyevo is the nearest rural locality.

References 

Rural localities in Sudogodsky District